Bad manners or Bad Manners may refer to:

 Bad manners, a lapse in etiquette
 Bad Manners, an English two-tone and ska band
 Bad Manners (1984 film), an American teen comedy
 "Bad Manners", a song on Freda Payne's 1995 album The (Unauthorized) I Hate Barney Songbook: A Parody
 Bad Manners (1997 film), an American comedy–drama